An impostor or imposter is a person who pretends to be somebody else.

Impostor(s), Imposter(s), The Impostor(s), or The Imposter(s) may also refer to:

Computing
 Impostor (computer graphics) or sprite, an image or animation integrated into a larger scene
 Impostors, a fictional alien race and the antagonists of the 2018 social deduction game Among Us

Film
 , a film by George Abbott and Dell Henderson
 Impostor (1921 film), a German silent film
 The Impostor (1921 film), a film by Robert N. Bradbury
 The Impostor (1926 film), a film starring Evelyn Brent
 The Impostor (1927 film), a German silent film
 The Impostor (1944 film), a film by Julien Duvivier
 The Imposter (1975 American film), a TV film starring Meredith Baxter
 The Imposter (1975 Hong Kong film), a film produced by Shaw Brothers
 The Imposter, a 1984 TV film featuring Ken Olandt
 El Impostor (film), a 1997 American film produced by Oscar Kramer
 The Impostors, a 1998 film by Stanley Tucci
 Impostor (2001 film), a science fiction film
 The Imposter (2008 film), a Christian film by Dan Millican
 The Imposter (2012 film), a documentary about the 1997 case of Frédéric Bourdin

Literature
 Impostor (short story), a 1953 science fiction story by Philip K. Dick
 The Imposter (novel), a 1927 novel by the French writer Georges Bernanos
 "The Imposter" (short story), a 1997 story by Nathanael West
 The Impostor, a 1977 novel by Helen McCloy
 The Impostors (play), a 1789 play by Richard Cumberland
 , a 2014 novel by Javier Cercas
 L'impostore, an 18th-century play by Carlo Goldoni
 If I Were for Real (play), a 1979 Chinese play, also translated as The Impostor
 Tartuffe (full title: Tartuffe, or the Impostor), a 1664 comedic play by Molière

Music
 Imposter (album), a 2021 album by Dave Gahan and Soulsavers
 The Imposter (album), a 2005 album by Kevin Max
 The Impostor (Banjo Concerto), a 2011 concerto by Béla Fleck
 "Imposter", a 1981 song by The Moondogs
 "Imposter", a song by Oingo Boingo from the 1981 album Only a Lad
 "Impostor", a song by The Doubleclicks from the 2013 album Lasers and Feelings
 The Imposters, a backing band for Elvis Costello

Television
 Impostor (TV series), a 2010 Philippine TV series starring Maja Salvador and Melai Cantiveros
 The Imposter, a syndication title for the DuMont TV series Colonel Humphrey Flack (1953–54)
 Imposters (TV series), a 2017 American television series on Bravo
 "The Impostors" (Thunderbirds), an episode of Thunderbirds
 The Imposters, a hidden-camera television pilot co-starring comedian Mal Sharpe
 L'Imposteur ("The Imposter"), a 2016 Québec television series starring Marc-André Grondin
 Impostora (The Impostor), a 2008 Philippine television series starring Sunshine Dizon and Iza Calzado
 "Imposters" (Star Trek: Picard), an episode of the third season of Star Trek: Picard

See also
 
 Impostor syndrome, when a person is unable to internalize accomplishments
 Masih ad-Dajjal ("The Impostor Messiah"), an evil figure in Islamic eschatology
 The Imposture, a 1640 play by James Shirley